Gonorynchus gonorynchus is a species of fish in the family Gonorynchidae, found on temperate continental shelves worldwide. Common names for this fish include mousefish, ratfish, sandfish, and sand eel.

Location
Gonorynchus gonorynchus inhabits  the coasts of the southern third of Africa stretching from Skeleton Coast to Mozambique as well as the coasts of Australia and Japan. Its range also stretches into the Eastern Pacific with specimens found off the coast of Chile.

Diet and habitat
Gonorynchus gonorynchus lives in and above the seabed at depths ranging from 0–200 m. It is generally nocturnal and buries itself in the seabed during daylight hours. It has a varied diet, eating zooplankton and free-swimming and buried invertebrates. The young are preyed upon by seabirds. As well adults of the species are preyed upon by juvenile South African hakes.

References

Gonorynchidae
Fish described in 1766
Taxa named by Carl Linnaeus